Sterling  is an unincorporated community in Burleigh County, North Dakota, United States at the intersection of Interstate 94 and U.S. Route 83. It is part of the "Bismarck, ND Metropolitan Statistical Area" or "Bismarck-Mandan". Sterling's US Postal Code is 58572.

Sterling was not a census-designated place in the 2000 census.

Demographics
Population figures are estimates.

References

Unincorporated communities in North Dakota
Unincorporated communities in Burleigh County, North Dakota